Shrek Smash n' Crash Racing is a kart racing video game released in November 2006. The game is based on the Shrek franchise. Players have the option of playing one of twelve Shrek characters, using racing and combat skills to defeat other racers. It was released for the GameCube, PlayStation 2, PlayStation Portable, Nintendo DS, and Game Boy Advance systems. Shrek Smash n' Crash Racing was the final game based on a DreamWorks Animation film to be released on the GameCube.

The original music for the game was composed by Finn Robertson.

Gameplay
Shrek Smash n' Crash Racing is a kart racing video game. The players first must pick from a line up of twelve different characters from the Shrek universe. The maximum number of racers on a track at any one time is six. Each of the characters have special stats that are not displayed in the game. Any other non player racers will be controlled by the computer and chosen at random.

Then, the player has the option to pick the track or cup tournament they want to play on. Once the track is chosen, then the race will begin. The objective of the races is to win in first place. On the tracks are item barrels that contains items inside of them. The items are used as an advantage to help the racer out.

The tracks are also filled with obstacles and shortcuts that can either help or harm the racers. On the track, characters also have a special item that can be used to attack other karts or obstacles. If another racer is hit by a special item then they will spin out. The characters also can jump to avoid obstacles or reach other parts of the track. The racer that wins first place in either tournament mode or a regular race then gets to the trophy.

Characters & Karts
The game features 12 playable characters total, with 8 of these needing to be unlocked through gameplay progression. Each Character has their own kart to drive in with each one being a vehicle or a creature.

 Donkey - Dragon
 Gingy -  Cupcake Horse
 Goldilocks - Papa Bear
 Humpty Dumpty - Chicken Cup
 Little Red Riding Hood - Big Bad Wolf
 Pinocchio - Puppet Horse
 Prince Charming - Stallion
 Princess Fiona - Onion Carriage 
 Puss in Boots - Bull
 Shrek - Swamp Beast
 Three Little Pigs - Flying Magic Carpet
 Thelonious - Black Horse

 Unlockable characters

Reception

Upon release, the PS2 and GameCube versions received “average” reviews, while the GBA version received mixed reviews and the DS version received negative reviews. GameRankings gave it a score of 59% for the GameCube version; 51.4% for the PlayStation 2 version; 50% for the Game Boy Advance version; and 43% for the DS version.

References

External links
 

2006 video games
Activision games
Game Boy Advance games
GameCube games
Kart racing video games
Nintendo DS games
PlayStation 2 games
PlayStation Portable games
Shrek video games
Video games developed in Australia
Torus Games games
Multiplayer and single-player video games